Domenico Spada (born 15 September 1980 in Rome) is an Italian professional boxer who has fought at middleweight.

Spada fought Sebastian Zbik for the interim WBC middleweight title twice, losing both bouts by unanimous decision. He also lost to Marco Antonio Rubio and Martin Murray for the WBC Middleweight title .

Other notable fighters Spada has faced include Darren Barker and Mahir Oral.

Spada is currently trained by Valerio Monti.

Professional Record
Professional record consists of 50 bouts for a total of 43 wins (20 by KO) and 7 losses.

Titles Held
WBC Silver Middleweight Title (2012) 
WBC International Middleweight Title (2006–07, 2007–08) 
Italian Middleweight Title (2006) 
IBF Youth Middleweight Title (2004–05) 
challenger for the WBC Middleweight Title (2009 / 2010 / 2014) 
challenger for the EBU Middleweight Title (2011 / 2013)

References

External links

1980 births
Boxers from Rome
Living people
Italian male boxers
Italian Romani people
Middleweight boxers